Suau Rural LLG is a local-level government (LLG) of Milne Bay Province, Papua New Guinea. The Suau language is spoken in the LLG.

Wards
01. Koukou
02. Iloilo
03. Bonarua
04. Modewa
05. Baibaisiga
06. Suau Island
07. Sibalai
08. Ipulai
09. Savalala
10. Navabu
11. Isuae
12. Savaia
13. Oyamamania
14. Isudiudiu
15. Saga'aho
16. Isuisu
17. Isudau
18. Sea'sea Island
19. Sea'sea North
20. Silosilo
21. Kaukau
22. Bonabona Island
23. Dahuni
24. Leileiafa
25. Suieabina
26. Gadaisu
27. Wadauda
28. Boilave
29. Takwatakwae

References

Local-level governments of Milne Bay Province